The African giant blind snake (Afrotyphlops mucruso), also called the Zambezi beaked blind snake, is a species of snake in the Typhlopidae family.

References 

Afrotyphlops
Reptiles described in 1854